Mangifera flava is a species of plant in the family Anacardiaceae. It is found in Cambodia and Vietnam.

References

flava
Vulnerable plants
Flora of Cambodia
Flora of Vietnam
Taxonomy articles created by Polbot